Statistics of Czechoslovak First League in the 1961–62 season.

Overview
It was contested by 14 teams, and Dukla Prague won the championship. Adolf Scherer was the league's top scorer with 24 goals.

Stadia and locations

League standings

Spartak ZJŠ Brno invited for the Inter-Cities Fairs Cup from a lower division.

Results

Relegation play-off 

Dynamo Žilina were relegated to the Czechoslovak Second League.

Top goalscorers

References

Czechoslovakia - List of final tables (RSSSF)

Czechoslovak First League seasons
Czech
1961–62 in Czechoslovak football